Ansgar Guido Karl Johannes Heveling (born 3 July 1972) is a German lawyer and politician of the Christian Democratic Union (CDU) who has been serving as a member of the Bundestag from the state of North Rhine-Westphalia since 2009.

Early career 
From 2005 until 2009, Heveling served as deputy chief of staff to North Rhine-Westphalia's State Minister of Finance Helmut Linssen in the government of Minister-President Jürgen Rüttgers.

Political career 
Heveling first became a member of the Bundestag in the 2009 German federal election, representing Krefeld. He is a member of the Committee on Legal Affairs and Consumer Protection; the Committee on the Scrutiny of Elections, Immunity and the Rules of Procedure; and the Committee on the Election of Judges (Wahlausschuss), which is in charge of appointing judges to the Federal Constitutional Court of Germany. From 2009 until 2013, he was also a member of the Subcommittee on European Affairs. He serves as his parliamentary group's rapporteur on copyright and criminal law.

In the negotiations to form a Grand Coalition of the Christian Democrats (CDU together with the Bavarian CSU) and the SPD following the 2013 federal elections, Heveling was part of the CDU/CSU delegation in the working group on cultural and media affairs, led by Michael Kretschmer and Klaus Wowereit.

From 2018, Heveling was part of a cross-party working group on a reform of Germany’s electoral system, chaired by Wolfgang Schäuble. Since 2022, he has been a member of the Commission for the Reform of the Electoral Law and the Modernization of Parliamentary Work, co-chaired by Johannes Fechner and Nina Warken.

Other activities 
 Deutsche Welle, Alternate Member of the Supervisory Board
 German Historical Museum (DHM), Member of the Board of Trustees
 Haus der Geschichte, Member of the Board of Trustees

Political positions
In June 2017, Heveling voted against Germany's introduction of same-sex marriage.

References

External links 

  
 Bundestag biography 

1972 births
Living people
Members of the Bundestag for North Rhine-Westphalia
Members of the Bundestag 2021–2025
Members of the Bundestag 2017–2021
Members of the Bundestag 2013–2017
Members of the Bundestag 2009–2013
Members of the Bundestag for the Christian Democratic Union of Germany